The following is a list of events for which one of the commonly accepted names includes the word "massacre".

Definition 
Massacre is defined in the Oxford English Dictionary as "the indiscriminate and brutal slaughter of people or (less commonly) animals; carnage, butchery, slaughter in numbers". It also states that the term is used "in the names of certain massacres of history".

The first recorded use in English of the word massacre in the name of an event is due to Christopher Marlowe, who in c. 1600 referred to what is now known as the St. Bartholomew's Day massacre as "The massacre at Paris".

Massacre can also be used as a verb, as "To kill (people or, less commonly, animals) in numbers, esp. brutally and indiscriminately". The first usage of which was "(c. 1588) Men which make no conscience for gaine sake, to breake the law of the æternall, and massaker soules (...) are dangerous subjects", and this usage is not recorded in this list.

There are many alternative terms with similar connotations, such as butchery, carnage, bloodbath, mass killing, atrocity, etc. as well as euphemisms such as Vespers, Blutgericht or "attack", "incident", "tragedy" (etc.), use of which are outside the scope of this list.

Massacre is also used figuratively to describe dramatic events that did not involve any deaths, such as the "Hilo massacre" and the "Saturday Night Massacre"; this usage is also outside of the scope of this list.

Before or in 1945

{|class="sortable wikitable" style="font-size:90%"
|+
|-
! Date
! Location
! Name
! data-sort-type="number" | Deaths
! class="unsortable" | Description
|-
|
|
|Battle of Changping
|0,400,000400,000
|Live burial of surrendered State of Zhao soldiers during Qin's wars of unification.
|-
|
|
|Xin'an massacre
|0,200,000200,000+
|Live burial of surrendered Qin dynasty soldiers after the Battle of Julu.
|-
|
|
|Asiatic Vespers
|0,080,00080,000–150,000
|Wholesale massacre of all Roman and Italic citizens in Asia Minor, starting the Mithridatic Wars.
|-
|
|
|Menai massacre
|0,000,001Unknown
|Gaius Suetonius Paulinus ordered the Roman army to destroy the Celtic Druid stronghold on Anglesey in Britain, sacking Druidic colleges and sacred groves. The massacre helped impose Roman religion on Britain and sent Druidism into a decline from which it never recovered.
|-
|
|
|Massacre of Xuzhou
|0,100,000Hundred-thousands
|Warlord Cao Cao invaded several cities of Xu Province after his father, Cao Song, was killed in the province. Dead bodies of civilians blocked the Si River.
|-
|
|
|Massacre of Thessaloniki
|0,007,0007,000
|Emperor Theodosius I of Rome ordered the executions after the citizens of Thessaloniki murdered a top-level military commander during a violent protest against the arrest of a popular charioteer.
|-
|
|
|Massacre of Banu Qurayza
|0,000,600600–900
|Muhammad ordered his followers to attack the Banu Qurayza because according to Muslim tradition he had been ordered to do so by the angel Gabriel. Muhammad had a treaty with the tribe which was betrayed. 600–900 members of the Banu Qurayza (all males old enough to have pubic hair, all of whom were non-combatants) were beheaded, while the women and children of the tribe were sold into slavery (Tabari, Ibn Ishaq). Al Waqidi influence is in Ibn Ishaqs biography. Stillman and Watt deny the authenticity of al-Waqidi. Al-Waqidi has been frequently criticized by Muslim Ulama, who claim that he is unreliable. A reliable source says all the warriors were killed based on Sa'd ibn Mu'adh judgement whom was appointed by Banu Qurzaya for arbitration. 2 Muslims were killed.
|-
|
|
|Massacre of Verden
||0,004,5004,500
|Charlemagne ordered the massacre of 4,500 imprisoned rebel pagan Saxons in response to losing two envoys, four counts, and twenty nobles in battle with the Saxons during his campaign to conquer and Christianize the Saxons during the Saxon Wars.
|-
|
|
|St. Brice's Day massacre
|0,000,001Unknown
|King Æthelred II "the Unready" of England ordered all Danes living in England killed. The Danes were accused of aiding Viking raiders. The King of Denmark, Sweyn Forkbeard, invaded England and deposed King Ethelred in 1013.
|-
|
|
|1033 Fez massacre
|0,006,0006,000+
|Following their capture of the city of Fez from the Maghrawa tribal confederation, warriors of the Zenata Berber Banu Ifran tribe slaughtered over 6,000 Moroccan Jews.
|-
|
|
|Massacre of the Jews of Granada
|0,004,0004,000
|Apparently angered by a rumour that Jewish vizier Joseph ibn Naghrela intended to assassinate the king and take the throne for himself, a Muslim mob killed him and hung his body on a cross. The mob went on to kill the Jewish population of the city.
|-
|
|
|Massacre of the Rhineland Jews
|0,060,00012,000
|Series of mass murders of Jews perpetrated by mobs of French and German Christians of the People's Crusade.
|-
|
 |
|Jerusalem Massacre
|0,060,000Thousands
| The culminating massacre of the First Crusade: Frankish expeditionary forces broke into besieged Jerusalem (then part of the Fatimid Caliphate) and killed Muslims and Jews.
|-
|
|
|Massacre of the Latins
|0,060,00060,000–80,000
|Wholesale massacre of all Latin (Western European) inhabitants of Constantinople by a mob.
|-
|
|
|Massacre at Béziers
|0,015,00015,000+
|First major military action of the Albigensian Crusade
|-
|
|
|Massacre of the French in Sicily
|0,003,0003,000
|Revolt against king Charles I, starting the War of the Sicilian Vespers
|-
|May 18, 1302
|Bruges, Belgium
|Matins of Bruges
|2,000
|Flemish forces massacre thousands of French soldiers in their sleep.
|-
|
|
|1349 Erfurt massacre
|0,000,100100+
|Against the backdrop of the Black Death persecutions, members of Erfurt's Jewish community were lynched. Any survivors were expelled from the city.
|-
|mid-14th century
|
|Crow Creek massacre
|0,000,500500
|Prehistoric massacre of Central Plains villagers in what is now South Dakota, involving scalping and dismemberment of the victims.
|-
|
|
|Brussels massacre
|0,000,0066–20
|When a clerical usury scandal led to allegations of host desecration, multiple local Jews were executed or otherwise killed and the rest of the Jewish community was banished.
|-
|
|
|Massacre of Monzievaird
|0,000,120120–160
|Immediately following the Battle of Knock Mary, members of the Highland Scottish clans Drummond and Campbell burned the old kirk at Monzievaird, killing many Clan Murray folk holed up inside it.
|-
|
|
|Lisbon massacre
|0,001,9001,900+
|When a New Christian expressed skepticism about an apparent miracle, he was dragged out of the Church of São Domingos and beaten to death by an enraged crowd. Afterwards, New Christians in general were scapegoated for drought and plague sweeping the country at the time. Encouraged by seditionist Dominican friars, mobs of local townspeople and foreign sailors tortured and killed nearly 2,000 known or suspected New Christians for alleged heresy and deicide.
|-
|
|
|Massacre of the Telal
|9,400
|A firman was issued by newly declared caliph Selim I about massacring the Alawite in the city of Aleppo.
|-
|
|
|Massacre in the Great Temple of Tenochtitlan
|Thousands
|Spanish troops and Tlaxcalan allies under the command of conquistador Pedro de Alvarado killed a large number of Aztec priests, nobles and warriors in the Templo Mayor for unclear reasons.
|-
|
|
|Stockholm massacre
|0,000,08080–90
|Days after his coronation in Stockholm, King Christian II of Denmark—trying to maintain the Kalmar Union, a personal union between Sweden, Norway and Denmark, and thus keep up his claims to the Swedish throne—liquidated nobles and bishops who earlier had opposed him, or who might stir up fresh opposition.
|-
|
|Cajamarca, Atahualpa, Peru
|Cajamarca massacre
|0,002,000~2,000
|The Battle of Cajamarca was the unexpected ambush and seizure of the Inca ruler Atahualpa by a small Spanish force led by Francisco Pizarro, on November 16, 1532. The Spanish killed thousands of Atahualpa's counsellors, commanders and unarmed attendants in the great plaza of Cajamarca, and caused his armed host outside the town to flee. The capture of Atahualpa marked the opening stage of the conquest of the pre-Columbian Inca civilization of Peru.
|-
|
|
|Spanish Inquisition
|50–100,000
|[The Inquisition was originally intended primarily to identify heretics among those who converted from Judaism and Islam to Catholicism. The regulation of the faith of newly converted Catholics was intensified after the royal decrees issued in 1492 and 1502 ordering Jews and Muslims to convert to Catholicism or leave Castile, resulting in hundreds of thousands of forced conversions, the persecution of conversos and moriscos, and the mass expulsions of Jews and of Muslims from Spain, the confiscation of properties, and the imprisonment, torture and killing of those perceived as not 'sufficiently Catholic', or who were wealthy, or those with whom others wanted to settle scores.
|-
|
|
|Mérindol massacre
|Hundreds or even thousands
|Francis I of France ordered that the Waldensians of the village of Mérindol be punished for their dissident religious activities. Provençal and papal soldiers killed large numbers of Waldensian villagers.
|-
|
|
|Massacre of Vassy
|0,000,06363
|The murder of Huguenot worshipers and citizens in an armed action by troops of Francis, Duke of Guise.
|-
|
|
|Massacre of Sens
|0,000,100100
|French Catholics tied 100 French Huguenots to poles and drowned them in the Yonne.
|-
|
|
|Cyprus massacre
|0,030,00030,000–50,000
|Ottoman forces capturing Cyprus killed mostly Greek and Armenian Christian inhabitants.
|-
|
|
|Massacre of Novgorod
|0,002,0002,000–60,000
|Oprichniki were unleashed upon the city of Novgorod by Ivan the Terrible.
|-
|
|
|Massacre of St. Bartholomew's Day
|0,005,0005,000–70,000
|The French King's soldiers and subjects slaughtered Huguenots; it was the first massacre to be labeled by that word in the English language.
|-
|
|
|Clandeboye massacre
|0,000,200200
|During a meeting between The Earl of Essex and Sir Brian McPhelim O'Neill at Belfast Castle, the English forces turned on the O'Neills and killed 200 of them.
|-
|
|
|Rathlin Island massacre
|0,000,200~600
|A massacre of MacDonnell clansmen by English forces. 
|-
|
|
|Massacre of Smerwick<ref>"the wanton massacre of Smerwick" 'The Monthly Repertory of English Literature, Parsons Galignani, 1824, p. 75.
"Massacre at Smerwick" recorded 1899; appositional "Smerwick massacre" in T. J. Barrington, Discovering Kerry: Its History, Heritage & Topography (1976), p. 76.</ref>
|0,000,600~600
|English troops commanded by Lord Grey de Wilton massacred Italian and Spanish forces at Dun an Oir in West Kerry
|-
|
|
|Junkersdorf massacre
|0,000,108108
|During the Cologne War, marauding soldiers in the employ of prince-elector Archbishop Ernest of Bavaria attacked a civilian convoy.
|-
|January 22–24, 1599
|Acoma Pueblo, New Mexico
|Acoma Massacre
|~800
|Spanish conquistadors launch an expedition and massacre Acoma people
|-
||
|
|Chinese massacre of 1603
|0,015,00015,000–25,000
|Fearing an uprising by the large Chinese community in the Philippines, the Spanish colonists carried out a preemptive massacre, largely in the Manila area, in October 1603.
|-
|
|
|Jamestown massacreAlfred Abioseh Jarrett, The Impact of Macro Social Systems on Ethnic Minorities in the United States, Page 29,
Greenwood Publishing Group, 2000
|0,000,347347
|The Powhatans killed 347 settlers, almost one-third of the English population of the Virginia colony.

|-
|
|
|Lamey Island Massacre
|0,000,400~300
|Dutch forces massacred indigenous inhabitants

|-
|
|
|Fort Mystic massacre
|0,000,400400–700
|Connecticut colonists under the command of Captain John Mason and Narragansett and Mohegan allies set fire to a fortified Pequot village near the Mystic River.
|-
||
|
|"Chinese massacre of 1639"
|0,017,00017,000–22,000
|The Spanish and their Filipino allies carried out a large-scale massacre, in which 17,000 to 22,000 Chinese rebels died.
|-
|
|
|Ulster massacres
|0,004,0004,000–12,000
|The Ulster Massacres were a series of massacres and resulting deaths amongst the ~40,000 Protestant settlers which took place in 1641 during the Irish Rebellion.
|-
|
|
|Portadown massacre
|0,000,100~100
|The Portadown massacre took place in November 1641 at what is now Portadown, County Armagh. Up to 100 mostly English Protestants were killed in the River Bann by a group of armed Irishmen. This was the biggest massacre of Protestant colonists during the 1641–42 uprising.
|-
|
|
|Bolton massacre
|0,000,200200–1,600
|Royalist forces killed many of the town's defenders and citizens.Lonely Planet
|-
|
|
|Yangzhou massacre
|0,800,000Up to 800,000
|Qing troops killed residents of Yangzhou as punishment for resistance
|-
|–46
|Sichuan, China
|Sichuan massacre
|1,000,000 est.
|There is no reliable figure, but estimated 1 million out of 3 million Sichuanese died mainly due to the massacre by Zhang Xianzhong's army.
|-
|
|
|Dunoon massacre
|0,000,07171
|The Clan Campbell after receiving requested hospitality according to custom, slaughtered their Lamont Clan hosts in their beds and threw their bodies down the well to poison the water should they have missed anyone.
|-
|
|
|Khmelnytsky Uprising
|0,000,07110s of 1000s
|Between 1648 and 1656, tens of thousands of Jews were killed by the rebels, and to this day the Khmelnytsky uprising is considered by Jews to be one of the most traumatic events in their history. 
|-
|
|
|Batih massacre
|8,000–8,500
|After the Battle of Batih, Zaporozhian Cossacks under the command of Hetman Bohdan Khmelnytsky carried out a mass execution of Polish–Lithuanian Commonwealth prisoners of war, horrifying even the Cossacks' own Crimean Tatar allies.
|-
|July 18–31, 1656
|Daugavpils, Latvia
|Siege of Dyneburg
|3,400
|Russian troops kill all of the defenders of the Dyneburg fortress
|-
|
|
|Lachine massacre
|0,000,02424–250
|1,500 Mohawk warriors launch a surprise attack on the small (375 inhabitants) French settlement of Lachine, destroying a substantial portion of it and killing or capturing many of its inhabitants.
|-
|
|
|Massacre of Glencoe
|0,000,03838
|Government soldiers, mainly from Clan Campbell, killed members of the Clan MacDonald of Glencoe.
|-
|January 24–25, 1704
|Ayubale, Apalachee Province, Florida
|Apalachee massacre
|1,100+
|British attack Spanish-backed Apalachee settlements.
|-
|1705
|Sendling, Germany
|Sendling's night of murder
|1,100
|Bavarian peasants rise up and protest, but are killed in infighting.
|-
|October 27 – November 2, 1708
|Baturyn, Ukraine
|Baturyn massacre
|~15,000
|The Muscovite troops of Peter I captured and exterminated the civilians in the Ukrainian city of Baturyn.
|-
|November 1, 1708 – 1709
|Lebedyn, Ukraine
|Executions of Cossacks in Lebedin
|~900
|Russian officials kill Ukrainians accused of siding with rebel leader Ivan Mazepa
|-
|
|
|Massacre of Hailuoto
|0,010,000800
|The Cossacks of the Russian Empire killed inhabitants of the Hailuoto Island with axes during the Great Wrath (part of the Great Northern War).
|-
|April–October 1721
|Anchuthengu Fort, Anchuthengu, India
|Attingal Outbreak
|140–151
|First organized revolt against British authority in India; all soldiers at the fort were massacred.
|-
|November 29, 1729
|Natchez, Mississippi
|Natchez Massacre
|230
|Natchez people attack French civilians in the area after decades of deteriorating relations.
|-
|June 6, 1736
|Massacre Island, Ontario
|Massacre Island (Ontario)
|21
|A mostly Sioux group allegedly killed 21 French explorers.
|-
| – November 22, 1740
|
|1740 Batavia massacre
|0,010,00010,000
|At least 10,000 Chinese Indonesians in and near Batavia were slaughtered by members of other ethnic groups living in the area, in collaboration with Dutch soldiers.
|-
|July 8 or 30, 1755
|Blacksburg, Virginia
|Draper's Meadow massacre
|5-8
|Shawnee soldiers massacre a family, causing the town to be abandoned.
|-
|1756
|Dingman's Ferry Bridge, New Jersey
|Hunt-Swartout raid
|5
|Lenape soldiers, allegedly unprovoked, massacred the Swartout family and enslaved 3 neighbors.
|-
|
|
|Penn's Creek massacre
|0,000,01414
|A group of Indians attacked settlers on Penn's Creek.
|-
|November 3, 1757
|Magdalena de Kino, Sinaloa, Mexico
|First Magdalena massacre
|31
|Seri people attack a village of Spanish inhabitants
|-
|1757
|Strausstown, Pennsylvania
|Bloody Springs massacre
|One family
|A pioneer family in Pennsylvania was massacred during the French and Indian War.
|-
|July 26, 1764
|Greencastle, Pennsylvania
|Enoch Brown school massacre
|11
|Four Lenape killed and scalped the teacher and 10 students
|-
|
|
|Massacre of Uman
|2,000–33,000
|During the Koliivshchyna, a Haydamak rebel leader named Maksym Zalizniak ordered the slaughter of many civilians in the town of Uman, with priority given to targeting Poles, Jews and Uniates.
|-
|
|
|Massacre of St George's Fields
|0,000,0077
|British troops fired at a mob that was protesting at the imprisonment of John Wilkes, whose crime was criticizing King George III.
|-
|
|
|Boston Massacre
|0,000,0055
|British troops fired at a mob of colonists. This helped spark the American Revolution even though an all-colonist jury found the soldiers innocent.
|-
|
|
|Bloody Falls massacre
|0,000,02020
|Chipewyan warriors attacked an Inuit camp, killing men, women and children.Samuel Hearne and David Thompson, trekking in the footsteps , (From: Manitoba History Society June 1, 2005, Binning, Alexander)
|-
|April 30, 1774
|The current site of Mountaineer Casino, Racetrack and Resort, Ohio Country
|Yellow Creek massacre
|4+
|Virginian settlers massacre Mingo natives, leading to Lord Dunmore's War
|-
|March 13, 1775
|Westminster, Vermont
|Westminster massacre
|2
|Colonial police shoot two men rioting against being evicted, the aftermath of which leads to the creation of the Vermont Republic
|-
|mid-November 1776
|Magdalena de Kino, Sinaloa, Mexico
|Second Magdalena massacre
|Unknown
|All of Magdalena de Kino's residents died in an attack from the Seri people
|-
|
|
|Baylor Massacre
|0,000,01515
|British infantry troops attacked sleeping Continental Light Dragoons using bayonets.
|-
|
|
|Little Egg Harbor massacre
|0,000,03030–50
|British loyalists bayonetted Continental Light Dragoons as they slept.
|-
|
|
|Cherry Valley massacre
|0,000,04444
|A mixed force of Loyalists, British soldiers, and Iroquois of the Mohawk and Seneca tribes descended upon the town of Cherry Valley. They slaughtered 14 of the town's defenders and 30 noncombatants.
|-
|
|
|Waxhaw massacre
|0,000,113113
|Loyalist troops under the command of British Colonel Banastre Tarleton slashed and bayoneted fallen American troops during the late stages of the Battle of Waxhaws. Conflicting contemporary accounts claim violation of an American white flag by one or the other of the sides involved.
|-
|
|
|Sugarloaf massacre
|0,000,01515
|A group of loyalists and Indians during the American Revolutionary War led by Roland Montour attacked a group of American soldiers.
|-
|1780
|Kastania, Laconia, Greece
|Kastania massacre
|300+
|Ottomans break a Maniot siege and massacre the fleeing population.
|-
|
|
|Pyle's Massacre
|0,000,09393
|Patriot militia leader Colonel Henry Lee deceived Loyalist militia under Dr. John Pyle into thinking he was British commander Banastre Tarleton sent to meet them. Lee's men then opened fire, surprising and scattering Pyle's force.
|-
|August 24, 1781
|Aurora, Indiana
|Lochry's Defeat
|34–41
|British-Native forces massacre numerous Pennsylvania militiamen, capturing the rest.
|-
|September 13, 1781
|Floyds Fork, Kentucky
|Long Run massacre
|32
|Kentuckian settlers are pushed out by Wyandot during a skirmish.
|-
|
|
|Zong massacre
|0,000,132 132–142
||In order to claim on insurance, 132 to 142 African slaves were thrown overboard by the crew of the British slave ship Zong when potable water ran low.
|-
|
|
|Gnadenhutten massacre(Moravian massacre)
|0,000,09696
|Pennsylvania militia men attacked a Moravian mission and killed 96 peaceful Christian American Indians there in retaliation for unrelated deaths of several white Pennsylvanians.
|-
|August 14, 1784
|Sitkalidak Island, Alaska
|Awa'uq Massacre
|200–3,000
|Russian fur trader Grigory Shelikhov massacres the Alutiiq natives.
|-
|July 17, 1789
|Middletown, Kentucky
|Chenoweth Massacre
|5
|Last major Native raid in Jefferson County, Kentucky.
|-
|
|
|Olowalu Massacre
|~100
|In retribution for several thefts, maritime fur traders under the command of Simon Metcalfe fired cannons at the approaching canoes of Native Hawaiian villagers.
|-
|January 2, 1791
|Stockport, Ohio
|Big Bottom massacre
|12–14
|Lenape and Wyandot tribesmen massacre a group of American squatters.
|-
|
|
|Champ de Mars massacre
|0,000,01212–50
|Soldiers of the French National Guard fire into a crowd of republican protesters.
|-
|
|
|September MassacresDavid Andress, The Terror: The Merciless War for Freedom in Revolutionary France, Chapter 4, Macmillan, 2006
|0,001,440~1,440
|Popular courts in the French Revolution sentenced prisoners to death, including around 240 priests.
|-
|
|
|First Massacre of Machecoul
|0,000,200Around 200
|Vendean peasants angered at mass conscription and the Civil Constitution of the Clergy slaughtered many republican troops and officials, along with locals believed to be supporters of the republic.
|-
|
|
|Avranches massacre
|0,000,800Around 800
|Catholic and Royal Army prisoners of war, and later suspected counterrevolutionaries and royalist sympathizers, were murdered by republican troops.
|-
||
|
|Massacre of Praga
|0,020,00020,000
|Inhabitants of the Warsaw district Praga were massacred by pillaging Russian troops following the Battle of Praga.
|-
|August 29, 1797
|Tranent, Scotland
|Massacre of Tranent
|12-25+
|British troops shoot Scottish protestors against conscription, and then rape and pillage a nearby village.
|-
|May 29, 1798
|Gibbet Rath, Curragh, Ireland
|Gibbet rath massacre
|300–500
|British troops massacre hundreds of Irish rebels.
|-
|
|
|1804 Haiti massacre
|0,003,0003,000–5,000
|Massacre of French people in Haiti.
|-
|
|
|Boyd massacre
|0,000,06666
|Whangaroa Māori killed and ate 66 crew and passengers on board the Boyd.
|-
|
|
|Fort Mims massacre
|247
|A force of Creek Indians belonging to the Red Sticks stormed and captured Fort Mims, then killed almost all of the surviving pro-American natives, métis people, white settlers, slaves, and militia still inside it.
|-
|
|
|Madulla massacre
|20
|Soldiers from the 73rd Regiment of Foot attacked a cave where Kandyan rebels were hiding, killing 20 civilians who were hiding in the cave.
|-
|
|
|Uva–Wellassa massacre
|0,000,001Unknown
|During the suppression of the 1818 Uva–Wellassa uprising (also known as the Great Rebellion) Sir Robert Brownrigg ordered that all males between 15 and 60 years in the Uva-Wellassa region to be driven out, exiled or killed.Sri Lanka is to revoke British Governor's infamous Gazette Notification , Asian Tribune, Sat, March 12, 2011. Retrieved October 21, 2013.
|-
|
|
|Peterloo Massacre
|0,000,01111
| Manchester and Salford Yeomanry charged a meeting of 60,000–80,000 people campaigning for reform of parliamentary representation.
|-
|
|
|Constantinople Massacre of 1821
|0,000,001Unknown
|Hundreds of Greeks were massacred by the Ottomans, including the Greek patriarch, bishops and officials.
|-
|
|
|Navarino massacre
|0,003,0003,000
|The whole Turkish population of Navarino, which was around 3000, were killed by Greeks.
|-
|
|
|Chios massacre
|0,052,000~52,000
|Tens of thousands of Greeks on the island of Chios were slaughtered by Ottoman troops in 1822.
|-
|
|Naousa, Greece
|Naousa massacre
|2,000
|Greek civilians were slaughtered by Ottoman Empire.
|-
|
|Kasos, Greece
|Kasos massacre
|7,000
|Ottoman-Egyptian army slaughtered Greek civilians
|-
|February 10, 1828
|Cape Grim, Tasmania, Australia
|Cape Grim massacre
|30
|Australian farmers throw Aboriginal Tasmanians off a cliff in reprisal for previous killings of white farmers.
|-
|	Marchaterre,
|Salsipuedes Creek, Uruguay
|Massacre of Salsipuedes
|At least 40
|Uruguayan army under command of president Fructuoso Rivera slaughtered the last remains of the indigenous Charrua People, survivors were sent into a forced walk and then sold into slavery.
|-
|April 6, 1832
|Mitidja, Algeria
|Massacre of El Ouffia
|100
|French colonial officials kill all but 4 members of the tribe of El Ouffia.
|-
|May 21, 1832
|Earlville, Illinois
|Indian Creek massacre
|15
|Dispute between settlers and Potawatomi
|-
|
|
|Cutthroat Gap massacre
|150
|A group of Osage warriors charged into a Kiowa camp and brutally slaughtered everyone there, including children.
|-
|October 28, 1834
|Pinjarra, Western Australia, Australia
|Pinjarra massacre
|16–81
|Colonial settlers killed local Pindjarup people.
|-
|October 18, 1835
|Portland, Victoria, Australia
|Convincing Ground massacre
|60–200
|White whalers massacre Gunditjmara whalers, after tensions had risen.
|-
|
|
|Dade massacre
|0,000,108108
|Two U.S. Army companies under the command of Major Francis L. Dade were marching from Fort Brooke (Tampa) to Fort King (Ocala) when they were attacked by about 200 Seminoles. One hundred and eight soldiers were killed; only two men from the command survived.
|-
|
|
|Goliad massacre
|0,000,400~400
|Around 400 Texians killed by Santa Anna's Mexican Army Presidio la Bahia Goliad Palm Sunday March 27, 1836.
|-
||
|
|Waterloo Creek massacre
|0,000,100100–300
|Aboriginal Australians killed by a force of colonial mounted police.
|-
|
|
|Piet Retief Delegation massacre
|0,000,100100
|Under the orders of Dingane kaSenzangakhona, a Voortrekker delegation led by Piet Retief was seized during land treaty negotiations and taken to the Kwa-Matiwane hillside, where its members and their servants were summarily executed.
|-
|
|
|Weenen massacre
|0,000,532532
|Zulu impis sent by Dingane attacked and slaughtered Khoikhoi, Basuto and Voortrekkers who were camped at multiple sites.
|-
||
|
|Myall Creek massacre
|0,000,02828
|A posse (which was mostly white, but included a black African) killed Aboriginal Australians. The perpetrators were convicted and sentenced to death.
|-
|
|
|Bad Axe Massacre
|0,000,06666
|150 Sauk and Meskwaki killed by the U.S. Army
|-
|
|
|Killough massacre
|0,000,01818
|In the largest attack by Native Americans on white settlers in Texas, a disaffected band of Cherokee, Caddo, Coushatta, and perhaps other ethnicities formed a war party and killed 18 members of the extended Killough family, who had settled in the area after the Senate of the Republic of Texas nullified the (land) treaty which President Sam Houston had negotiated with the Cherokee.
|-
||
|
|Haun's Mill massacre
|0,000,01919
|About 240 Livingston County Missouri Regulators, Missouri State militiamen and anti-Mormon volunteers killed 18 Mormons and one non-Mormon friend.History of the Church, Vol. III, pp 182–186.
|-
|June 1839
|Central Victoria, Australia
|Campaspe Plains massacre
|6–40
|Colonial settlers launch reprisal raids on Djadjawurrung lands.
|-
|mid-1839
|Camperdown, Victoria, Australia
|Murdering Gully massacre
|35–40
|Colonial settlers effectively decimate the Tarnbeere Gundidj clan of the Djargurd Wurrong.
|-
|March 1, 1840
|Coleraine, Victoria, Australia
|Fighting Waterholes massacre
|40–60
|White settlers massacre Indigenous Australians after the latter had allegedly stolen the settlers' sheep.
|-
|
|
|Gippsland massacres
|0,000,450~450
|A series of massacres spanning several years: 1840 – Nuntin, 1840 – Boney Point, 1841 – Butchers Creek – 30–35, 1841 – Maffra, 1842 – Skull Creek, 1842 – Bruthen Creek – "hundreds killed", 1843 – Warrigal Creek – between 60 and 180 shot, 1844 – Maffra, 1846 – South Gippsland – 14 killed, 1846 – Snowy River – 8 killed, 1846–47 – Central Gippsland – 50 or more shot, 1850 – East Gippsland – 15–20 killed, 1850 – Murrindal – 16 poisoned, 1850 – Brodribb River – 15–20 killed. See also Angus McMillan.
|-
|
|
|Massacre of Elphinstone's army
|0,016,00016,000
|Afghan tribes massacred Elphinstone's British army including some 12,000 civilians.
|-
|September 17, 1842
|Presidio San Antonio de Béxar, San Antonio, Texas
|Dawson massacre
|36
|Texians attempting to surrender are killed during the fog of war.
|-
|March 25, 1843
|Saltillo, Coahuila, Mexico
|Black bean episode
|17
|Mexicans tell Texian and American diplomats that 1/10 of the prisoners they captured would die. They force Texians to choose out of a random bowl of beans, and those who chose a black bean were shot.
|-
|1843–1846
|Hakkari, Ottoman Empire
|Massacres of Badr Khan
|~10,000 
|Thousands of Assyrians perished during the massacres. 
|-
|October 17 – November 8, 1850
|Aleppo, Syria
|Massacre of Aleppo
|5,070
|Muslim residents of the city violently riot against the Christian residents.
|-
|May 15, 1854
|Round Valley Indian Tribes of the Round Valley Reservation, California
|Asbill massacre
|40
|California pioneers searching for gold stumble upon the group of Yuki, and kill them all.
|-
||–26, 1856
|
|Pottawatomie massacre
|0,000,0055
|In retaliation for the Sacking of Lawrence by proslavery settlers, John Brown led a band of abolitionist settlers-including some members of the Pottawatomie Rifles—in a massacre of five proslavery settlers north of Pottawatomie Creek.
|-
|
|
|Crabb massacre
|0,000,08484
|Mexican rebels fought American rebels at Caborca, Sonora. Out of less than ninety Americans, about thirty were killed in battle and the rest were executed by the Mexicans.
|-
|
|
|Mountain Meadows massacre
|0,000,120120–140. 
|Mormon militia, some dressed as Indians, and Paiute tribesmen killed and plundered unarmed members of the Baker-Fancher emigrant wagon train.
|-
|
|
|Marais des Cygnes massacre
|0,000,0055
|Proslavery leader Charles Hamilton and about 30 men under his command capture 11 Free-Staters from Kansas and takes them to a defile in, where they begin shooting at them. Five of the prisoners are killed, and another five are severely wounded.
|-
|June 15, 1858
|Jeddah, Saudi Arabia
|Jeddah massacre of 1858
|~5,000
|"Hadramites" allegedly massacred the inhabitants of the town.
|-
|1859
|Brewarrina, Australia
|Hospital Creek Massacre
|300–400
|A White settler abducted an Aboriginal girl, so tribe members warned him to return the girl. He didn't, so both he and the girl were killed. In response, white settlers massacred the tribe.
|-
|
|
|Gallinas massacre
|3
|A war party of Mescalero Apache attacked a small group of Confederate soldiers, killing three of them.
|-
|October 17, 1861
|Springsure, Australia
|Cullin-la-ringo massacre
|19 (original), 370 (reprisal)
|Aboriginals massacred a white family, so the town's white settlers slaughtered Aborigines.
|-
|
|
|Bee Creek Massacre
|2
|Union troops of the 18th Missouri Infantry Regiment summarily executed two Confederate prisoners of war near the Bee Creek Bridge, a few miles south of Weston, Missouri.
|-
|
|
|Nueces massacre
|0,000,03737
|German Texans trying to flee to Mexico to avoid being drafted into the Confederate Army were attacked by Confederate soldiers.
|-
|
|
|Palmyra massacre
|10
|In retaliation for the abduction of Andrew Alsman, a local Union supporter, ten Confederate prisonerers were executed on the orders of Colonel John McNeil
|-
|
|
|Shelton Laurel massacre
|0,000,01313
|Thirteen boys and men, accused of being Union sympathizers and spies, were summarily executed by members of the 64th North Carolina Regiment of the Confederate Army.
|-
|
|
|Bear River massacre
|0,000,225~225
|3rd Regiment California Volunteer Infantry destroyed a village of Shoshone in southeastern Idaho.
|-
|
|
|Lawrence Massacre
|0,000,150~150
|Pro-Confederate bushwhackers known as Quantrill's Raiders attacked the town of Lawrence, Kansas during the American Civil War in retaliation for the Union attack on Osceola, Missouri.
|-
|
|
|Fort Pillow massacre
|0,000,350350
|After their surrender following the Battle of Fort Pillow, most of the Union garrison—consisting primarily of black troops—as well as civilians, including women and children, were massacred by Confederate forces under the command of General Nathan Bedford Forrest.
|-
|
|
|Centralia Massacre
|24
|Pro-Confederate bushwhackers led by William T. Anderson captured and shot a number of Union soldiers, then scalped and mutilated their corpses. One of the participants was future outlaw Jesse James.
|-
|
|
|Sand Creek massacre
|0,000,200~200
|Colorado Territory 90-day militia destroyed a peaceful village of Cheyenne and Arapaho on the eastern plains.Hoig, Stan. (1977). The Sand Creek Massacre. Norman, Oklahoma: University of Oklahoma Press. 
|-
|
|
|American Ranch massacre
|8
|Cheyenne and Sioux warriors attacked a ranch and killed eight people, three of them cowboys.
|-
|July 30, 1866
|New Orleans, Louisiana
|New Orleans massacre of 1866
|34–200
|Black Republican voters protesting for better rights are attacked by white residents.
|-
|February 7 – May 1868
|Murujuga, Australia
|Flying Foam massacre
|18–153
|Reprisal massacres for the deaths of 3 white workers led to the decline of the Yapurarra people.
|-
|September 28, 1868
|Opelousas, Louisiana
|Opelousas massacre
|150–300
|White supremacists attack a white Republican schoolteacher, and then attack the black residents of Opelousas.
|-
|
|
|Washita Massacre (1938)
|0,000,02929–150
|Lt. Col. G. A. Custer's 7th cavalry attacked a village of sleeping Cheyenne led by Black Kettle. Custer reported 103—later revised to 140—warriors, "some" women and "few" children killed, and 53 women and children taken hostage. Other casualty estimates by cavalry members, scouts and Indians vary widely, with the number of men killed ranging as low as 11 and the numbers of women and children ranging as high as 75. Before returning to their base, the cavalry killed several hundred Indian ponies and burned the village.Andrist, Ralph K., The Long Death: The Last Days of the Plains Indians, University of Oklahoma Press, 2001, 371 pages, pp 157–162, Churchill, Ward,  A Little Matter of Genocide: Holocaust and Denial in the Americas, 1492 to the Present, City Lights, 1997, 381 pages, p 236, The Saint Francis Herald, "Cherry Creek Massacre recognized in magazine", St. Francis, Kansas, November 17, 2005
|-
|
|
|Tianjin Massacre
|0,000,06060
| Attacks on French Catholic priests and nuns, violent belligerence from French diplomats, and armed foreign intervention in Tianjin.
|-
|
|
|Chinese massacre of 1871
|0,000,01717–20
|A mob of over 500 men entered Chinatown in Los Angeles, rioted, ransacked, then tortured and killed 18 Chinese-Americans, making this among the largest mass lynchings in American history.
|-
|April 15, 1873
|Colfax, Louisiana
|Colfax massacre
|62–153
|KKK and former Confederate soldiers massacre black residents during a standoff.
|-
|
|
|Cypress Hills Massacre
|0,000,01313
|A group of American and Canadian wolfers got into a dispute with some Assiniboine warriors over a missing horse. Violence broke out in unclear circumstances, causing the deaths of thirteen Assiniboine.
|-
|
|
|Massacre Canyon
|0,000,065approx. 65–100
|A Lakota war party attacked a band of Pawnee during their summer buffalo hunt, with many victims mutilated and some set on fire. The victims were mostly women and children.
|-
|
|
|Batak massacreBousfield, Jonathan. (2002). The Rough Guide to Bulgaria. P352. Rough Guides. 
|0,003,0003,000–5,000
|Ottoman army irregulars killed Bulgarian civilians barricaded in Batak's church.
|-
|July 1876
|Hamburg, South Carolina
|Hamburg massacre
|7
|Red Shirts attack a black county in South Carolina.
|-
|
|
|Donnelly Massacre
|0,000,0355
|Biddulph Peace Society vigilantes attack two separate locations and kill 5 members of the Donnelly family. No one is ever convicted of the crime.
|-
|
|
|Danville Massacre
|0,000,0355
|Racially motivated assault at a market, resulting in five men being killed, four of them black, with violence continuing for several days. It occurred immediately before the elections and contributed to political disfranchisement.
|-
|
|
|Frog Lake Massacre
|0,000,0099
|Cree warriors, dissatisfied with the lack of support from the Canadian Government for Treaty Indians, and exacerbated by food shortages resulting from the near-extinction of bison, killed nine white settlers, including Indian agent Thomas Quinn.W. B. Cameron, "Massacre at Frog Lake" , University of Alberta Libraries, response by W. B. Cameron to "Massacre at Frog Lake", Edmonton Journal, April 4, 1939. Retrieved August 2, 2009.
|-
|
|
|Rock Springs massacre
|0,000,02828
|Rioting white immigrant miners killed 28 Chinese miners, wounded 15, and burned 75 Chinese homes.Larson, History of Wyoming, pp. 141–44.
|-
|
|
|Thibodaux massacre
|0,000,03535+
|Members of white paramilitary groups attack striking black sugar cane planation workers.
|-
|
|
|Rio Tinto massacre
|0,000,04545+
| Spanish Civil Guard fires on protesting mineworkers and community
|-
|
|
|Jim Jumper massacre
|At least 7
|At a Seminole camp northeast of Lake Okeechobee, a biracial (half-black, half-Native American) man named Jim Jumper shot and killed several Seminole for unclear reasons before being killed himself by a Seminole man named Billy Martin.
|-
|
|
|Wounded Knee Massacre
|0,000,200200–300
|The U.S. 7th Cavalry intercepted a band of Lakota people on their way to the Pine Ridge Reservation for shelter from the winter; as they were disarming them, a gun was fired, and the soldiers turned their artillery on the Lakota, killing men, women and children.
|-
|
|
|Massacre of Italians at Aigues-Mortes
|8–150
|Italian immigrant workers were attacked by French villagers and laborers.
|-
|–1896
|
|Hamidian massacres
|0,100,000100,000–300,000
|style="text-align:left; padding-left:0.5em;" |
Sultan Abdul Hamid II ordered Ottoman forces to kill Armenians across the empire. "They are now known as the Hamidian Massacres"
|-
|
|
|Port Arthur massacre
|1,000–20,0001,000–20,000
|Japanese troops killed somewhere between 1,000 and 20,000 civilians and surrendered Chinese soldiers for two or three days.
|-
|
|
|Kucheng massacre
|0,000,01111
| Members of a Chinese cult attacked British missionaries, killing eleven people and destroying two houses.
|-
|
|
|Lattimer massacre
|0,000,01919
|Unarmed striking miners were shot in the back: many were wounded and 19 were killed.
|-
|
|
|Mazocoba massacre
|0,000,400~400
|Mexican Army troops attack Yaqui hostiles west of Guaymas, Sonora, Mexico.
|-
|
|Blagoveshchensk and Sixty-Four Villages East of the River
|Blagoveshchensk massacre and Sixty-Four Villages East of the River massacre
|0,007,0007,000
|The Russian Empire invaded the two cities ruled by the Qing Dynasty. A total of 7,000 innocent Chinese civilians were killed in the massacres.
|-
|
|
|Leliefontein massacre
|0,000,03535
|During the Second Boer War, Boer forces under Manie Maritz massacred 35 Khoikhoi for being British sympathisers.
|-
|
|
|Moro Crater massacreAmerican Troops Killing Muslims: A Massacre to Remember , by Christine Gibson, AmericanHeritage.com, March 8, 2006
|0,000,800800–1,000
|A U.S. Army force of 540 soldiers under the command of Major General Leonard Wood, accompanied by a naval detachment and with a detachment of native constabulary, armed with artillery and small firearms, attacked a Muslim village hidden in the crater of a dormant volcano.
|-
|
|
|Atlanta massacre of 1906
| At least 27 killed, over 90 wounded
|White on black violence
|-
|
|
|Santa María School massacre
|0,002,2002,200–3,600
|A massacre of striking workers, mostly saltpeter (nitrate) miners, along with wives and children, committed by the Chilean Army in Iquique, Chile. It occurred during the peak of the nitrate mining era, which coincided with the Parliamentary Period in Chilean political history (1891–1925). With the massacre and an ensuing reign of terror, not only was the strike broken, but the workers' movement was thrown into limbo for over a decade.
|-
|–May 1909
|
|Adana massacre
|0,015,00015,000–30,000
|In April 1909, a religious-ethnic clash in the city of Adana, amidst governmental upheaval, resulted in a series of anti-Armenian pogroms throughout the district, resulting in an estimated 15,000 to 30,000 deaths.Akcam, Taner. A Shameful Act. 2006, pp. 69–70: "fifteen to twenty thousand Armenians were killed"Century of Genocide: Eyewitness Accounts and Critical Views By Samuel. Totten, William S. Parsons, Israel W. Charny
|-
| – July 30, 1910
|
|Slocum massacre
|6–200
|Armed white mobs massacred black residents of the town of Slocum, Texas.
|-
|October 23, 1911
|Tripoli, Libya
|Battle and massacre at Shar al-Shatt
|290
|290 Italian soldiers surrender to Ottoman forces, but all are tortured and killed.
|-
|October 24, 1911
|Mechiya Oasis, Libya
|Mechiya Oasis massacre
|4,000
|Italian revenge for the massacre of 290 soldiers the day prior.
|-
|
|
|Lena massacre
|0,000,270270
|Striking gold miners were shot at by Russian troops while marching.
|-
|October 21, 1912
|Forrahue, Zona Sur, Chile
|Forrahue massacre
|16
|Chilean police trying to oust Huilliche homeowners shoot 16 Mapuche dead.
|-
|1912–1913
|territories occupied by Serbia, especially in the regions of today's Kosovo, Western Macedonia and Northern Albania
|Massacres of Albanians in the Balkan Wars
|20,000–25,000
|Series of mass murders of Albanian civilians perpetrated by the Montenegrin and Serbian armies.
|-
|
|
|Ludlow massacre
|0,000,02020
|Twenty people, 11 of them children, died during an attack by the Colorado National Guard on a tent colony of 1,200 striking coal miners and their families at Ludlow, Colorado. The event led to wider conflict quelled only by Federal troops sent in by U.S. President Woodrow Wilson.
|-
|August 21, 1914
|Tamines, Belgium
|Massacre of Tamines
|384
|German soldiers massacre civilians after capturing the town.
|-
|
|
|Abschwangen massacre
|65
|Soldiers of the Imperial Russian Army summarily executed 65 German civilians (including 28 locals and 37 refugees from southern East Prussia) in retaliation for a German cavalry reconnaissance unit killing a Russian officer who happened to be a member of the Trubetskoy family.
|-
|1916
|Western Australia, Australia
|Mowla Bluff massacre
|300–400
|A cattle station manager rounds up and murders hundreds of Aborigines.
|-
|January 22–25, 1918
|Shamkir, Azerbaijan
|Shamkhor massacre
|1000+
|Azerbaijani paramilitaries stopped a train of Russian soldiers returning to Russia proper from the Russian Civil War, and massacred the soldiers after they refused to give up their weapons.
|-
|
|
|1918 Porvenir massacre
|15
|In retaliation for the Brite Ranch raid, Texas Rangers, soldiers of the 8th Cavalry Regiment and local ranchers killed unarmed Mexican Americans.
|-
| – May 3, 1918
|
|Vyborg massacre
|0,000,360360–420
|At least 360 mostly Russian military personnel and civilians were killed after the Finnish Civil War Battle of Vyborg by the Finnish Whites. The victims include a large number of other nationalities which the Whites presumed as Russians. The killed were not affiliated with the Reds, but most were even White supporters. Also 450–1,200 captured Finnish Red Guard fighters were executed.
|-
|September 27, 1918
|Tafas, Syria
|Tafas massacre
|250
|Ottoman soldiers, retreating from the incoming British and Arab forces, massacre the town's population, in an attempt to demoralize the forces.
|-
|December 10, 1918
|Sarafand al-Amar, Palestine
|Surafend affair
|50
|Village residents allegedly kill a Kiwi villager, prompting Australian forces to massacre the town and a nearby Bedouin camp.
|-
|
|
|Pinsk massacre
|0,000,03535
|Soldiers of the Polish Land Forces under the command of General Antoni Listowski killed a group of Jews for holding an "illegal meeting".
|-
|
|
|Jallianwala Bagh massacre
|0,000,379379–1,526"Massacre of Amritsar". Encyclopædia Britannica. Retrieved February 15, 2008.
|90 British Indian Army soldiers, led by Brigadier Reginald Dyer, opened fire on an unarmed gathering of men, women and children. The firing lasted for 10 to 15 minutes, until they ran out of ammunition.
|-
|June 5–7, 1919
|Ghaibalishen, Nagorno-Karabakh
|Khaibalikend massacre
|600–700
|Armenian residents in the towns of Ghaibalishen, Jamilli, and Karkijahan were massacred by Azeri and Kurdish troops under the request of the Governor of Nagorno-Karabakh.
|-
|–17, 1919
|Menemen, Izmir, Turkey
|Menemen massacre
|200
|Greek troops and local Greeks massacred Turks.
|-
|
|
|Elaine massacre
|105–242
|White mobs slaughtered between 100 and 237 black people along with 5 white people.
|-
|
|
|Washington State Centralia massacre
|6
|A conflict breaks out between members of the Industrial Workers of the World and the American Legion on the first anniversary of Armistice Day in unclear circumstances, killing one Wobbly and five Legionnaires.
|-
|December 24–25, 1919
|Yuxarı Əylis, Nakhchivan, Azerbaijan
|Agulis massacre
|1,400
|Azerbaijani paramilitaries and Azeri refugees from Zangezur destroyed the predominantly Armenian town of Agulis and massacred its Armenian residents.
|-
|–1921
|Armutlu Peninsula, Turkey
|Yalova Peninsula massacres
|5,500–9,900
|Local Muslims of the peninsula were massacred by Greek troops, local Greeks, Armenians and Circassians.
|-
|–1921
|
|Gando massacre
|0,005,0005,000+
|After the Hunchun incident, soldiers of the Imperial Japanese Army murdered thousands of Korean civilians.
|-
|
|
|Ocoee massacre
|30–35 blacks, 2 whites
|On election day, a white mob attacked African-Americans in an attempt to stop them from voting, and the black residents were forced to leave.
|-
|
|
|Croke Park massacre
|0,000,02323
|British Auxiliary police and Black and Tans fired at Gaelic football spectators at Croke Park.David Leeson, "Death in the Afternoon: The Croke Park Massacre, 21 November 1920", Canadian Journal of History, vol. 38, no. 1 (April 2003)
|-
| – June 1, 1921
|
|Tulsa race massacre
|0,000,36100–300
|Mobs of white residents attacked black residents and businesses of the Greenwood District in Tulsa, Oklahoma.
|-
|
|
|Perry massacre
|3
|White on black violence
|-
|
|
|Rosewood massacre
|0,000,0088
|Several days of violence by white mobs, ranging in size up to 400 people, resulted in the deaths of six blacks and two whites and the destruction of the town of Rosewood, which was abandoned after the incident.
|-
|
|
|Kantō Massacre
|0,006,0006,000+
|In the aftermath of the 1923 Great Kantō earthquake, Japanese soldiers and police officers, along with vigilantes, slaughtered at least six thousand Japanese Koreans and left-wing political dissidents.
|-
|May 4, 1924
|Kirkuk, Mandatory Iraq
|Kirkuk Massacre of 1924
|300+
|Following a dispute over market prices, Assyrian Levies (recruited by the British Empire) massacre civilians and engage in widespread looting in the city of Kirkuk.
|-
|
|
|Napalpí massacre
|0,000,400400
|Argentine police officers and ranchers killed hundreds of Toba people in retaliation for the murder of a French immigrant.
|-
|
|
|Hanapepe massacre
|0,000,02020
|A dispute between officers of the Kauai County Police Department and striking Visayan sugar workers over the kidnapping of two Ilocano strikebreakers escalated into a violent exchange that killed 16 strikers and four cops.
|-
|March 1925
|Huara, Chile
|Marusia massacre
|500
|Chilean government forces attack striking miners at a saltpeter mine.
|-
||
|
|Shanghai massacre of 1925
|0,000,3030–200
|Members of the Shanghai Municipal Police opened fire on Chinese protesters.
|-
|
|
|Shaji massacre
| 0,000,050~50
|A group of strikers in Canton, China, in support of a workers' strike in Hong Kong, were fired upon by British and French troops, who claimed to have been provoked by gunfire. Over 200 casualties resulted.
|-
|June 1926
|Kimberley, Western Australia, Australia
|Oombulgurri Massacre
|16-100+
|Aborigines killed a pastoralist in the Australian outback, prompting white settlers to murder and burn the bodies of at least 16 Aborigines.
|-
||
|
|Shanghai Massacre
|0,000,300300–5000
|KMT elements carried out a full-scale purge of Communists in all areas under their control.
|-
|
|
|Columbine Mine massacre (1928)
| 0,000,0066
| In a fight between Colorado state police and a striking coal miners, the police used firearms, killing six and wounding dozens. The miners claimed that machine guns were fired at them, which was denied by the state police.
|-
||
|
|Bath School massacre (1981)
|0,000,04545
|37 children and a 30-year-old teacher at Bathtown elementary school were killed by a major explosion set off by school board treasurer Andrew Kehoe. About a half-hour after the explosion, Kehoe then detonated dynamite in his truck, killing himself and five others, including a fourth-grader and four adults. Also, some hours before the event, Kehoe killed his wife at their Bath Township home. This event was the deadliest mass murder in a school in United States history.
|-
|
|
|Coniston massacre (1981)
|0,000,03131–170
|The last known officially sanctioned massacre of indigenous Australians occurred in the vicinity of Coniston cattle station in the Territory of Central Australia in retaliation for the death of a dingo hunter named Frederick Brooks.
|-
|
|
|Banana Massacre
|0,000,04747–2,000
|The Banana massacre was a massacre of workers for the United Fruit Company that occurred on December 6, 1928, in the town of Ciénaga near Santa Marta, Colombia. An unknown number of workers died after the Conservative government of Miguel Abadía decided to send the Colombian army to end a month-long strike organized by the workers' union in order to secure better working conditions. The government of the United States of America had threatened to invade with the U.S. Marine Corps if the Colombian government did not act to protect United Fruit's interests.
|-
|
|
|Saint Valentine's Day massacre
|0,000,0077
|Al Capone's gang shot rival gang members and their associates.
|-
|
|
|1929 Hebron massacre
|0,000,06969
|Arabs kill 69 Jews after being incited by religious leaders. Survivors were relocated to Jerusalem, "leaving Hebron barren of Jews for the first time in hundreds of years."
|-
|
|
|1929 Safed massacre
|0,000,01818
|Arabs killed 18 Jews, wounded around 40, and some 200 houses were burned and looted.
|-
|
|Marchaterre, Les Cayes, Haiti
|Les Cayes massacre
|12–22
|United States Marine Corps troops fire upon a group of 1,500 Haitians in Les Cayes who were protesting against the United States occupation of Haiti
|-
|
|
|Qissa Khwani bazaar massacre
|0,000,200200–250
|Soldiers of the British Raj fired on unarmed non-violent protestors of the Khudai Khidmatgar with machine guns during the Indian independence movement
|-
|
|
|Zilan massacre
|0,004,5004,500–47,000M. Kalman, Belge, tanık ve yaşayanlarıyla Ağrı Direnişi 1926–1930, Pêrî Yayınları, Istanbul, 1997, p. 105. 
|Turkish troops massacred Kurdish residents during the Ararat rebellion.
|-
|–July 11, 1932
|
|La Matanza
|0,010,00010,000–40,000
|After a peasant rebellion occurred in the western departments of El Salvador, President Maximiliano Hernández Martínez would order the violent repression against the rebellion, ending in an ethnocide that killed between 10,000 and 40,000 peasants and civilians, many of them from the Pipil people.
|-
|June 1933
|Kashgar, Xinjiang, China
|Kizil massacre
|800
|Uyghur and Kyrgyz soldiers break agreement not to harm retreating Han Chinese soldiers.
|-
|
|
|Simele massacre
|0,003,0003,000
|Iraqi Army killed 3,000 Assyrian men, women and children. The massacre, amongst other things, included rape, cars running over children and bayoneting children and pregnant women.
|-
|–July 1934
|
|Ranquil massacre
|0,000,477477
|The Chilean Army and Carabineros de Chile assassinated 477 workers and Mapuche indigenous after they started a revolt.
|-
|
|
|Gondrand massacre
|0,000,08080
|Ethiopian soldiers acting under the orders of Ras Imru attacked Italian civilians working for the Gondrand logistics company, killing 80 of them.
|-
| – December 1936
|
|Paracuellos massacres
|0,002,0002,000–3,000
|Mass killings against right-wing civilians and soldiers perpetrated by Republican troops and militiamen.
|-
|February 19–21, 1937
|Addis Ababa, Ethiopia
|Yekatit 12
|19,200–30,000
|Italian fascists massacre thousands of Ethiopians after a failed assassination attempt against Rodolfo Graziani, leader of Italian Ethiopia.
|-
|
|
|Ponce massacre
|0,000,01919
|The Insular Police fired on unarmed Nationalist demonstrators peacefully marching to commemorate the ending of slavery in Puerto Rico. It was the biggest massacre in Puerto Rican history.
|-
|
|Tongzhou, China
|Tungchow massacre
|223–260
|East Hebei Army massacred Japanese civilians and troops in Tongzhou.
|-
||–8, 1937
|
|Parsley massacre
|0,038,000Up to 38,000
|The Dominican military used machetes to brutally slash people to death and decapitate thousands of black Haitians; they also took people to the port of Montecristi, where thousands of Haitians were thrown into the ocean to drown with their hands and feet bound. Their executioners often inflicted wounds on their bodies before throwing them overboard in order to attract sharks. Survivors who managed to cross the border and return to Haiti told stories of family members being hacked with machetes and strangled by the soldiers, and children dashed against rocks and tree trunks.
|-
|–38
|
|Dersim massacre
|0,013,16013,160–70,000
|Turkish troops massacred Alevi residents during the Dersim Rebellion.
|-
|1937–38
|Vinnytsia, Ukraine
|Vinnytsia massacre
|9,000–11,000
|NKVD forces massacre thousands of ethnic Ukrainians, which is later used as propaganda by the Nazis.
|-
|1937–41
|Kurapaty, Belarus
|Kurapaty massacre
|30,000–250,000
|NKVD killed a large, unknown number of Belarusian dissidents in a forested area outside of Minsk. Most of these dissidents were Belarusian intelligentsia.
|-
| – January 1938
|
|Nanking MassacreFordham University webpage: Modern History Sourcebook
|0,300,000300,000+
|The Imperial Japanese Army pillaged and burned Nanking while, at the same time, murdering, enslaving, raping, and torturing prisoners-of-war and civilians.
|-
|
|
|Tsuyama massacre
|0,000,03030
|Mutsuo Toi, believing he was mistreated by his neighbors and rejected by women after being diagnosed with tuberculosis, murdered his own grandmother and 29 of his neighbors in a spree killing before shooting himself.
|-
|
|
|Seguro Obrero massacre
|0,000,08080
|After members of the National Socialist Movement of Chile (nicknamed "Nacistas") attempted a coup by taking over the Edificio del Seguro Obrero, they started a shootout with Carabineros de Chile. After the Nacistas surrendered when they were outmatched, the carabineros entered the place, and later they would group them together and shoot them.
|-
|
|
|Częstochowa massacre
|Approximately 1,140
|Polish civilians were shot, stabbed and beaten to death by soldiers of the Wehrmacht.
|-
||–May 1940
|
|Katyn massacre
|0,021,85721,857–25,700Aleksandr Shelepin's March 3, 1959, note to Khrushchev, with information about the execution of 21,857 Poles and with the proposal to destroy their personal files. Online 
|Soviet NKVD executed Polish intelligentsia, POWs and reserve officers."Katyn Massacre", Encyclopædia Britannica. Retrieved December 23, 2007.
|-
|May 25, 1940
|Vinkt, Belgium
|Vinkt massacre
|86–140
|Nazi German soldiers massacre Belgian civilians due to the town's previous resistance against capture.
|-
|
|Le Paradis village, commune of Lestrem, Northern France
|Le Paradis massacre
|0,000,09797
|Soldiers of the 14th Company, S.S. Division Totenkopf, under the command of Hauptsturmführer Fritz Knöchlein shot prisoners-of-war during the Battle of France.
|-
|
|
|Ip massacre
|0,000,174168–174
|After two Hungarian soldiers died in an explosion, a detachment of the Royal Hungarian Army killed between 152 and 158 ethnic Romanians, along with 16 reported deserters.
|-
|
|
|Jilava massacre
|0,000,06464
|Members of the Iron Guard murdered 64 political prisoners held in Jilava penitentiary.
|-
|February 7, 1941
|Lunka, Ukraine
|Lunca massacre
|~600 (hundreds)
|Ethnic Romanians trying to flee to Romania were shot at by Soviet border troops.
|-
|
|
|Fântâna Albă massacre
|0,000,04444–3,000
|Ethnic Romanians trying to cross the border from the Soviet Union into Romania were met with open fire by Soviet Border Troops.
|-
|
|
|Gudovac massacre
|0,196184–196
|The mass killing of around 190 Bjelovar Serbs by the Croatian nationalist Ustaše
|-
|–August 1941
|
|Glina massacres
|0,2,4002,400
|The mass killings of Serb peasants by the Ustashe in the town of Glina, that occurred between May and August 1941
|-
|
|
|Massacre of Kondomari
||0,000,02323–60
|Cretan civilians were shot by an ad hoc firing squad of German paratroopers as part of a series of reprisal killings.
|-
|–October 1941
|
|NKVD prisoner massacres
|0,100,000100,000+
|The Soviet NKVD executed thousands of political prisoners in the initial stages of Operation Barbarossa.
|-
|
|
|Kamianets-Podilskyi massacre
|0,023,600
|Police Battalion 320 and Einsatzgruppen under Friedrich Jeckeln, assisted by Hungarian troops and members of the Ukrainian Auxiliary Police, wipe out the city's Jewish community.
|-
|
|
|Medvedev Forest massacre
|0,000,157157
|On the personal orders of Joseph Stalin, the NKVD took a number of political prisoners held at Oryol Prison into Medvedev Forest and shot them.
|-
|–30, 1941
|
|Babi Yar massacre
|0,030,00033,771
|Nazi Einsatzgruppen killed the Jewish population of Kyiv.
|-
|–21, 1941
|
|Kragujevac massacre
||0,002,7962,796–5,000
|Nazi soldiers massacred Serb and Roma hostages in retaliation for attacks on the occupying forces.
|-
|–24, 1941
|
|Odessa massacre
|0,025,00025,000–34,000
|Romanian and German troops, supported by local authorities, massacred Jews in Odessa and the surrounding towns in Transnistria. The Romanians blamed Jews and communists for the detonation of a mine that was placed by Red Army sappers prior to their defeat.
|-
|October 27, 1941
|Slutsk, Belarus
|Slutsk affair
|4,000
|Nazi authorities, which had recently invaded the Soviet Union, primarily massacred Jewish residents of Slutsk, which helped develop Belarusian partisan efforts during WWII.
|-
| and 29, 1941
|
|Ninth Fort massacres of November 1941
|0,004,9344,934
|The first systematic mass killings of German Jews during the Holocaust.
|-
| and 
|
|Rumbula massacre
|0,025,00025,000
|25,000 Jews were killed in Rumbula Forest, near Riga, Latvia, by the Nazis.
|-
|
|
|Arakan massacres in 1942
|0,060,00060,000
|After local British forces retreated, violence erupted between pro-Japanese Rakhine Buddhists and pro-British Rohingya Muslims as a result of the power vacuum.
|-
|
|
|Laha massacre
|0,000,300300+
|The Japanese killed surrendered Australian soldiers.Peter Stanley The defence of the 'Malay barrier': Rabaul and Ambon, January 1942 principal historian to Australian War Memorial
|-
|–March 4, 1942
|
|Sook Ching massacre
|0,005,00025,000–50,000
|A systematic purge of perceived hostile elements among the Chinese Malayans and the Chinese in Singapore by the Japanese military following the Battle of Singapore.
|-
|
|
|First Dzyatlava massacre
|About 1,200
|Around 1,200 Jews were marched out of the Dzyatlava Ghetto into the Kurpiesze (Kurpyash) forest and shot by Order Police battalions, aided by members of the Lithuanian and Belarusian auxiliary police forces.
|-
|
|
|Lidice massacre
|0,000,340340
|Nazis killed 192 men, and sent the women and children to Nazi concentration camps where many died.David Vaughan. The Lidice massacre – atrocity and courage website of Czech Radio, June 11, 2002
|-
|
|
|Second Dzyatlava massacre
|2,000–3,000
|Liquidation of the Dzyatlava Ghetto. Thousands of Jews were taken to mass graves on the southern outskirts of town and shot so that they fell in them.
|-
|December 21, 1942
|Catavi Mine, Bolivia
|Catavi massacre
|19–400
|The Bolivian military shot hundreds of striking miners.
|-
|
|
|Khatyn massacre
|0,000,156156
|In retaliation for a Soviet partisan attack, the Dirlewanger Brigade and Schutzmannschaft Battalion 118 of the Ukrainian Auxiliary Police slaughter almost the entire population of Khatyn.
|-
|
|
|Naliboki massacre
|0,000,129129
|Soviet partisans killed 129 Polish villagers.
|-
|July 6, 1943
|Borovë, Korçë, Albania
|Borovë massacre
|107
|Wehrmacht forces massacre the town's population in response to Albanian partisan forces attacking a German convoy recently.
|-
|
|
|Dominopol massacre
|0,000,250250–490
|Polish villagers were attacked by a death squad of the Ukrainian Insurgent Army aided by local Ukrainian peasants.
|-
|
|
|Szczurowa massacre
|0,000,09393
|93 Romani people were rounded up and murdered in the village cemetery by Nazi occupiers.
|-
|
|
|Massacre of the Acqui Division
|0,005,1555,155
|Wehrmacht troops executed 5,155 POWs from the Italian 33 Infantry Division Acqui after the latter refused to hand over their weapons and resisted. A further 3,000 Italian POWs drowned at sea on transports that sank after hitting mines.
|-
|
|
|Wake Island massacre
|0,000,09898
|Japanese forces under Rear Admiral Shigematsu Sakaibara massacred the remaining 98 U.S. civilians in fear of the anticipation U.S. invasion of Wake Island two days after a U.S. air raid on the island.
|-
|
|
|Massacre of Kalavryta
|0,000,511511–1,200
|The extermination of the male population and the subsequent total destruction of the town of Kalavryta, in Greece, by a Jäger division that was part of the German occupying forces during World War II on December 13, 1943. It is the most serious case of war crimes committed during the Axis occupation of Greece during World War II.
|-
|–1945
|
|Massacres of Poles in Volhynia and Eastern Galicia
|0,003,00050,000–100,000 
|Multiple massacres of Polish civilians by the Ukrainian Insurgent Army (UPA).
|-
|–1947
|
|Foibe massacres
|0,003,0003,000–11,000
|Multiple massacres of Italian civilians by Yugoslav Partisans.
|-
|
|
|Khaibakh massacre
|0,000,700700
|The Khaibakh massacre refers to a report of mass execution of the ethnically Chechen population of the aul of Khaibakh, in the mountainous part of Chechnya by Soviet forces under NKVD Colonel Mikhail Gveshiani during the Deportation of the Chechens and Ingush.
|-
|
|
|Koniuchy massacre
|0,000,038At least 38
|Soviet and Jewish partisans murdered Lithuanian civilians, along with burning down their houses and slaughtering their livestock.
|-
|
|
|Huta Pieniacka massacre
|1,200
|Polish civilians were murdered by members of the 14th SS Volunteer Division "Galizien" accompanied by a paramilitary unit of Ukrainian nationalists (though some Ukrainian historians put the blame on SS police regiments instead).
|-
|
|
|Ardeatine massacre
|0,000,335335
|Mass killing carried out by German occupation troops as a reprisal for a partisan attack conducted on the previous day in central Rome against the SS Police Regiment Bozen.
|-
|
|
|Ascq massacre
|0,000,08686
|The Waffen-SS killed 86 men after a bomb attack in the Gare d'Ascq.
|-
|
|
|Ardenne Abbey massacre
|20
|Twenty Canadian Army POWs were executed by the Waffen SS during the Normany invasion.
|-
|
|
|Oradour-sur-Glane massacre
|0,000,642642
|The Waffen-SS killed 642 men, women and children without giving any specific reasons for their actions.
|-
|
|
|Distomo massacre
|0,000,218218
|Nazi war crime perpetrated by members of the Waffen-SS in the village of Distomo, Greece, during the Axis occupation of Greece during World War II.
|-
|
|
|Graignes massacre
|0,000,6161
|17 American POWs were bayoneted and shot by Waffen-SS soldiers. And 44 French civilians accused of assisting the Americans were rounded up and executed.
|-
|–25, 1944
|
|Ochota massacre
|0,010,00010,000
|Mass murders of citizens of Warsaw district Ochota in August 1944, committed by Waffen-SS soldiers, specifically the infamous SS Sturmbrigade R.O.N.A. commanded by Bronislav Kaminski.
|-
|–12, 1944
|
|Wola massacre
|0,040,00040,000–100,000
|Special groups of SS and German soldiers of the Wehrmacht went from house to house in Warsaw district Wola, rounding-up and shooting all inhabitants.
|-
|
|
|Sant'Anna di Stazzema massacre
|0,000,560560
|Retreating SS-men of the II Battalion of SS-Panzergrenadier–Regiment 35 of 16th SS Panzergrenadier Division Reichsführer-SS, rounded up 560 villagers and refugees—mostly women, children and older men—shot them and then burned their bodies.
|-
|August 17–18, 1944
|Courcelles, Belgium
|Courcelles massacre
|27
|Paramilitaries in support of the Rexist Party attack civilians after one of their party leaders is assassinated.
|-
|
|
|Rüsselsheim massacre
|0,000,0066
|The townspeople of Rüsselsheim killed six American POWs who were walking through the bombed-out town while escorted by two German guards.
|-
| – October 5, 1944
|
|Marzabotto massacre
|0,000,700700–1,800
|The SS killed Italian civilians in reprisal for support given to the resistance movement.Richard Owen. "Ten convicted for 1944 massacre", The Times (London), January 15, 2007
|-
|
|
|Malmedy massacre
|0,000,08888
|Nazi Waffen-SS soldiers shot American POWs (43 escaped).
|-
|
|
|Chenogne massacre
|0,000,06060
|German prisoners of war were shot by American soldiers in an unauthorized retaliation for the Malmedy Massacre.
|-
|
|
|Manila massacre
|0,100,000100,000
|Japanese occupying forces massacred an estimated 100,000 Filipino civilians during the Battle of Manila.
|-
|
|
|Pawłokoma massacre
|0,000,150150–500
|Members of the Polish Home Army, aided by Poles living in nearby villages, massacred ethnic Ukrainians.
|-
|
|
|Celle massacre
|0,000,300300
|Massacre of concentration camp inmates that took place in Celle at the end of the Second World War.
|-
|
|
|Bleiburg massacre
|0,050,00050,000–250,000
|Fleeing Croatian soldiers, members of the Chetnik movement and Slovene Home Guard associated with the fascist Ustaše Regime of Croatia were apprehended by Yugoslav Partisans at the Austrian border. Among those killed were an unknown number of civilians.
|-
|
|
|Sétif massacre
|0,006,0006,000
|Muslim villages were bombed by French aircraft and the cruiser Duguay-Trouin standing off the coast, in the Gulf of Bougie, shelled Kerrata. Pied noir vigilantes lynched prisoners taken from local gaols or randomly shot MuslimsYves Courrière, La guerre d'Algérie, tome 1 (Les fils de la Toussaint), Fayard, Paris 1969, 
|-
|
|
|Utah prisoner of war massacre
|0,000,0099
|Nine German prisoners of war are killed and 19 were wounded when, at midnight, an American soldier named Clarence V. Bertucci climbed a guard tower and fired at the tents of the sleeping prisoners. By the time his fifteen-second rampage was stopped, six of the POWs were already dead, and three more would later die of their wounds.
|-
|
|
|Ústí massacre
|0,000,08080–2,700
|The Ústí massacre (Czech: Ústecký masakr, German: Massaker von Aussig) was a lynching of ethnic Germans in Ústí nad Labem (German: Aussig an der Elbe), a largely ethnic German city in northern Bohemia ("Sudetenland") shortly after the end of the World War II, on July 31, 1945.Naimark, Norman: Fires of Hatred. Ethnic Cleansing in Twentieth – Century Europe. Cambridge, Harvard University Press, 2001.
|}

After 1945

See also
 :Category:Massacres
 :Category:Lists of massacres by country
 Crimes against humanity
 Genocides in history
 List of battles and other violent events by death toll
 List of events named pogrom
 List of genocides by death toll
 List of mass car bombings
 List of massacres at sea
 List of massacres in the United States
 List of terrorist incidents

References

External links

 
 World History Database, Alphabetic Listing of Battles Index of World battles.
 Radford, Robert, Great Historical Battles''. An extensive list of important battles and influential leaders, from −490 BC to present times.

Massacres

Massacres
Massacres